Rzeczyca  is a settlement in the administrative district of Gmina Sobienie-Jeziory, within Otwock County, Masovian Voivodeship, in east-central Poland.

References

Rzeczyca